John Ferguson may refer to:

Politics

Australia
John Ferguson (Australian politician) (1830–1906), Australian Senator and member of the Queensland Parliament
John Maxwell Ferguson (1841–1924), member of the Legislative Assembly of Western Australia
John Ferguson (New South Wales politician) (1903–1969), member of the New South Wales Legislative Council

Canada
John Ferguson (Upper Canada politician) (1756–1830), judge and politician in Upper Canada
John Ferguson (New Brunswick politician) (1813–1888), merchant and Canadian senator from New Brunswick
John Ferguson (Ontario politician) (1839–1896), physician and Canadian MP and senator from Ontario
John Ferguson (Canadian politician) (1840–1908), Scottish-born farmer, lumberman and political figure in Ontario, Canada

United Kingdom
John Ferguson (Scottish activist), Irish born, late 19th century Scottish Labour Party activist
John Ferguson (Conservative politician) (1870–1932), British Conservative MP
John Ferguson (Northern Ireland politician) (1911–?), UUP and Alliance Party politician

United States
John Ferguson (New York politician) (died 1832), Mayor of New York City
John P. Ferguson, member of the Delaware House of Representatives

Sports 
John Ferguson Sr. (1938–2007), Canadian ice hockey player
John Ferguson Jr. (born 1967), former general manager of the Toronto Maple Leafs of the National Hockey League
John Ferguson (curler) (born 1958), Canadian curler
John Ferguson (footballer, born 1848) (1848–1929), Scottish international footballer
John Ferguson (footballer, born 1891) (1891–1916), Scottish footballer
John Ferguson (footballer, born 1904) (1904–1973), English footballer (Wolverhampton Wanderers, Manchester United)
John Ferguson (footballer, born 1931), Australian rules footballer for Melbourne and South Melbourne
John Ferguson (footballer, born 1949), Australian rules footballer for Richmond
John Ferguson (rugby league) (born 1954), Indigenous Australian rugby league footballer
John Ferguson (sailor) (born 1944), Australian sailor
John Ferguson (sportscaster) (1919–2005), American sportscaster

Others 
John Ferguson (Ferguson bequest) (1787–1856), Scottish businessman and philanthropist, founder of the Ferguson bequest
John Ferguson (clergyman) (1852–1925), New Zealand born Australian Presbyterian minister
John Calvin Ferguson (1866–1945), Canadian-born American sinologist and educator
John Errol Ferguson (1948–2013), American serial killer and mass murderer
John Ferguson (organist) (born 1941), American organist, composer, and professor
Sir John Ferguson (police officer) (1891–1975), English chief constable
John Ferguson (musician) (born 1978), American composer and performer, and member of The Apples in Stereo
John Ferguson (priest) (died 1902), Anglican Dean of Moray, Ross and Caithness
John Howard Ferguson (1838–1915), judge in Louisiana
John Ferguson (born 1943), real name of gambling author and Blackjack Hall of Famer Stanford Wong
John H. Ferguson (1915–1970), American lawyer and U.S. ambassador
John H. Ferguson, defendant in the landmark American judicial case Plessy v. Ferguson
John Ferguson (chemist) (1838–1916), Scottish chemist and bibliographer
John Alexander Ferguson (1881–1969), New Zealand-born Australian lawyer, judge, book collector, and author
John Thomas Ferguson (born 1941), Canadian real estate developer and chancellor of the University of Alberta
John DeLancey Ferguson, American writer and academic
John Macpherson Ferguson, Royal Navy admiral
John Ferguson, a play by playwright St. John Greer Ervine

See also 
Jack Ferguson (disambiguation)
John Fergusson (disambiguation)